Naomh Aoife is a camogie club that won the Dubin championship in 1966 and which was associated with many of the leading personalities in the game.

Notable players
Notable players include Kathleen Ryder, Patricia Timmons Eithne Ryder Judy Doyle the Whelan sisters, Sally Blake, Phyllis Cambell, Doreen Rogers,

Colours
Naomh Aoife wore a navy gym tunic with two red bars around the skirt with a white blouse. When they played Celtic, Celtic being the younger had to take off their red bar

References

External links
 Camogie.ie Official Camogie Association Website
 Wikipedia List of Camogie clubs

Gaelic games clubs in Dublin (city)
Camogie clubs in County Dublin